In mathematics, a fake 4-ball is a compact contractible topological 4-manifold.  Michael Freedman proved that every three-dimensional homology sphere bounds a fake 4-ball.  His construction involves the use of Casson handles and so does not work in the smooth category.

References 

 Alexandru Scorpan, The Wild World of 4-Manifolds, American Mathematical Society,  

4-manifolds
Geometric topology